Quasi-rent or Marshallian rent is a temporary economic rent like returns to a supplier/owner. Alfred Marshall was the first to observe quasi-rents.

Quasi-rent differs from pure economic rent in that it is a temporary phenomenon. It can arise from the barriers to entry that potential competitors face in the short run, such as the granting of patents or other legal protections for intellectual property by governments.  It can also arise due to entrepreneurial responses to market fluctuation, or due to a lack of real  capital to meet near-term increases in demand.  In the longer term, however, the opportunity to profit will generate new capital and the quasi-rent will be competed away.

In the field of Industrial Organizations, Oliver Williamson points out that "[t]he joining of opportunism with transaction-specific investments (or what Klein, Crawford, and Alchian refer to as "appropriable quasi rents") is a leading factor in explaining decisions to vertically integrate."

Quasi-rent refers to that additional income which is similar to rent. According to David Ricardo, rent arises on account of fixed supply of land. But he recognizes other factors which are found in fixed supply in the short term. The additional income earned by these factors in the short-period is similar to rent.

References

Monopoly (economics)